The following lists events that happened in 1981 in Iceland.

Incumbents
President – Vigdís Finnbogadóttir 
Prime Minister – Gunnar Thoroddsen

Events

Births

7 January – Ármann Smári Björnsson, footballer
22 March – Rakel Logadóttir, footballer
29 April – Ragnhildur Steinunn Jónsdóttir, television personality
13 July – Helgi Daníelsson, footballer
31 August – Örn Arnarson, swimmer.
5 September – Logi Gunnarsson, basketball player
4 October – Friðrik Ómar, singer
12 October – Indriði Sigurðsson, footballer
17 October – Snorri Guðjónsson, handball player
10 December – Hólmar Örn Rúnarsson, footballer
14 December – Haraldur Freyr Guðmundsson, footballer

Deaths
28 July – Magnús Kjartansson, journalist, writer and politician (born 1919).

References

 
1980s in Iceland
Iceland
Iceland
Years of the 20th century in Iceland